Izzat Shameer Dzulkeple (born 24 June 1982) is an international Malaysian lawn bowler.

Bowls career

World Championships
In 2020 he was selected for the 2020 World Outdoor Bowls Championship in Australia.

Commonwealth Games
In 2022, he competed in the men's triples and the men's fours at the 2022 Commonwealth Games.

Other major events
Dzulkeple won a fours bronze medal in the 2015 Asia Pacific Bowls Championships and a pairs bronze four years later at the 2019 Asia Pacific Bowls Championships in the Gold Coast, Queensland. He also won a gold medal in the triples at the Lawn bowls at the 2019 Southeast Asian Games.

In November 2022, he won the silver medal at the World Singles Champion of Champions in Wellington, New Zealand.

In 2023, he won the singles gold medal at the 14th Asian Lawn Bowls Championship in Kuala Lumpur.

References

1982 births
Living people
Malaysian male bowls players
Commonwealth Games competitors for Malaysia
Bowls players at the 2022 Commonwealth Games
Southeast Asian Games medalists in lawn bowls
Southeast Asian Games gold medalists for Malaysia
Southeast Asian Games silver medalists for Malaysia
Competitors at the 2017 Southeast Asian Games
Competitors at the 2019 Southeast Asian Games
20th-century Malaysian people
21st-century Malaysian people